Charlie Briggs (November 13, 1932 - February 6, 1985) was an American actor. He appeared in numerous films and television shows throughout the 1950s to the 1980s.

Biography
Briggs was born in Henderson, North Carolina in 1932. Briggs began his acting career in 1958, appearing in TV series like Maverick, The Restless Gun, The Texan, Bronco and Not for Hire during the late 1950s. During the 1960s he continued to appear in TV series like Cheyenne, Daniel Boone, Bonanza and The Guns of Will Sonnett among others.

During that time he also branched out into film, working in films like The Absent-Minded Professor, Merrill's Marauders, The Beguiled and Charley Varrick. However, he kept working on TV during the 1970s and 1980s, mainly in action series. Briggs last acted in the film Brainstorm in 1983.

Briggs died in 1985, aged 52.

Filmography

Film

Television

References

External links
 
 Charlie Briggs

1932 births
1985 deaths
20th-century American male actors
American male film actors
American male television actors